Okells Brewery is a regional brewery founded in 1850 by Dr. William Okell in Douglas, Isle of Man.

History 
Dr. William Okell, a Cheshire surgeon, started Okell's Brewery in Castle Hill, Douglas in 1850. By 1874 Dr. Okell owned many of the pubs on the island, had convinced Tynwald, the island's parliament, to create an act ensuring the purity of beer brewed on the Isle of Man (Isle of Man Pure Beer Act), and built The Falcon Steam Brewery just off Broadway in Douglas. This imposing Building still stands today as Sheridan Apartments.

In 1972 Okells was bought by Heron & Brearley, a local drinks company.  Then, in 1986, it was merged with Castletown Brewery and H&B was renamed as The Isle of Man Breweries which later reverted to the name Heron and Brearley

In August 1994 Okells moved to a new purpose built brewery built inside the existing Heron & Brearley Warehouse outside Douglas.

Availability
Beers are available on the Isle of Man and in the UK. Okells have five UK pubs:

 Thomas Rigby's, Liverpool
 The Fly In The Loaf, Liverpool
 The Lady of Mann, Liverpool, 
 Bear and Billet, Chester
 The Academy, Aberystwyth, Wales

Plus fifteen pubs in the Market Town Taverns pub chain bought by Heron and Brearley.

The beer is also available through Morgenrot UK beer distributors. Bottled beer is also available in the Isle of Man, Sweden and Finland.

Beers
The company brews five regular cask ales:

 Okells Bitter
 Okells Olaf Mild
 Dr. Okells IPA
 Okells Jiarg
 Okells MPA

Four seasonal beers:

 Spring Ram
 Summer Storm
 Autumn Dawn
 St. Nick

And nine occasional beers:

 Okells Premium Steam
 Okells Alt Altbier
 Okells Maclir Wheat beer.
 Okells Saison
 Dr. Okells Elixir
 Dr. Okells Eastern Spice
 Castletown Bitter
 Olde Skipper
 Aile - a smoked Porter, voted Europe's best Smoked Beer in the 2010, 2011, 2012, and 2013 World Beer Awards.

Also available are Dr. Okells IPA, Okells Maclir, 1907 and Okells Aile, sold in bottles.

External links 
 Brewery website
 Brewery Blog
 MTT website
 Morgenrot Website

Beer in the Isle of Man
Food and drink companies established in 1850